Marie Antoinette Queen of France ( and also known as Shadow of the Guillotine) is a 1956 French-Italian historical drama film directed by Jean Delannoy who co-wrote the screenplay with Pierre Erlanger and Bernard Zimmer. The film stars Michèle Morgan and Richard Todd. It was nominated for the Palme d'Or (Jean Delannoy) at the 1956 Cannes Film Festival.

It was shot at the Billancourt Studios in Paris. The film's sets were designed by the art director René Renoux.

Cast

Michèle Morgan as Marie-Antoinette
Richard Todd as le comte Axel de Fersen
Jacques Morel as Louis XVI
Aimé Clariond as Louis XV
Jeanne Boitel as Mme Campan
Guy Tréjan as La Fayette
Marina Berti as a comtesse de Polignac
 Marcelle Arnold as 	Mme. Adélaïde
 Jane Marken as 	Mme Victoire
Jacques Dufilho as Marat
Daniel Ceccaldi as Drouet
Madeleine Rousset as Mme de Tourzel
 Suzy Carrier as 	Mme Elisabeth
 Paul Bonifas as 	Herman
Jacques Bergerac as le comte de Provence
 Edmond Beauchamp as Comte de Luxembourg
 Yves Brainville as 	Danton
 Anne Carrère as	Mme Du Barry
 Daniel Ceccaldi as 	Drouet
 Jean Claudio as 	Fouquier-Tinville
 Anne Doat as 	Rosalie
 Jacques Eyser as 	Joad
 Claudio Gora as	Kreutz
 Camille Guérini as 	Necker
 Jean Hébey as 	Marquis de Migennes
 Jacques Hilling as 	Duc de Brunswick
 Georges Lannes as 	d'Avaray
 Jacques Marin as 	Crieur de journaux
 Raphaël Patorni as 	Duc de Choiseul
 Michel Piccoli as 	Le Prêtre réfractaire
 Marcel Pérès as Simon
 Frédéric Valmain as 	Comte d'Artois
 Jean Vinci as 	Toulan
Michel Piccoli as le prêtre
 Jacques Morlaine as Un officier
 André Chanu as 	Le Prêtre assermenté
 Georgette Anys as Une émeutière
 Pierre Moncorbier as 	Le greffier

References

Bibliography
 Hayward, Susan. French Costume Drama of the 1950s: Fashioning Politics in Film. Intellect Books, 2010.
 Zea, Zahra Tavassoli . Balzac Reframed: The Classical and Modern Faces of Éric Rohmer and Jacques Rivette. Springer Nature, 2019.

External links

Marie-Antoinette reine de France at Alice Cinema

1956 films
Films about Marie Antoinette
French historical drama films
Italian historical drama films
1950s French-language films
1950s historical drama films
Films directed by Jean Delannoy
1956 drama films
Films set in the 18th century
Films set in Paris
Films shot at Billancourt Studios
Gaumont Film Company films
1950s French films
1950s Italian films